Newton is an email management application for iOS, Android, MacOS, Windows and ChromeOS developed by CloudMagic, Inc. The application is known for its searching capabilities, cross-platform abilities and user interface. It has been referred to as an email client better than Gmail's native app. As from September 15, 2016, CloudMagic has been renamed to Newton Mail with premium services, adding a host of new features and functions.

On August 7, 2018, it was announced that Newton would shut down effective September 25, 2018.

Newton was reopened on February 5, 2019, after being acquired by Essential Products. On February 12, 2020, Essential announced they were shutting down, including Newton's services. Newton will continue to run until April 30, 2020, after which point it will shut down as well. However, Newton Mail said on their website that they have identified an anonymous partner who could possibly keep Newton running after the closing date of April 30, 2020.

On May 13, 2020, Simform and SoFriendly announced the acquisition and relaunch of Newton Mail.

Features
Newton provides support for Gmail, Hotmail, Yahoo! Mail, Outlook.com, iCloud, Google Apps, Microsoft Exchange, Office 365, Mail.com, GMX, AOL and IMAP accounts. The application currently runs on all iOS devices running iOS 8 and above, and Android devices running Android 4.0 and above. Newton was one of the first apps on ChromeOS when Google decided to bring Android apps to Chromebook.

In March 2014, Newton announced Cards, a feature that connects popular services like Evernote, Pocket, Trello, Asana, Microsoft OneNote,  Salesforce.com, Zendesk and integrates them with the app. Cards make it easier for users to complete their workflow without leaving their email. Newton was one of the first apps to support Android Wear when it was announced in Google I/O, June 2014.

In January 2015, Newton launched a "Pro" subscription service ($9.99 monthly; $99.99 yearly) to allow greater than five mail accounts be added, preference and configuration sync, among other features. The Pro subscription was discontinued in April of the same year. In April 2016, Newton partially reintroduced premium services by introducing Sender Profile, then on September 14, 2016, renamed CloudMagic to Newton and fully introduced a subscription fee, initially at an introductory rate until July 2018, when the price are adjusted to be at the same rate as the 2015 Pro subscription. The change was met with negative responses from users.

In December 2018, Essential Products acquired CloudMagic.

Reception
Newton has received positive reviews. 

Newton for Mac was considered by some to be the best mail clients on Mac, with praise focused on the consistent emailing experience on desktop and its distraction-free design. In April 2014, Newton won the Webby Awards People's Voice for "Best Visual Design - Function". In September 2014, Newton won the "Best Design" award at the Evernote Platform Awards. Newton was also praised by Really Good Emails for using plain-text email to improve user engagement.

References

External links
 

Android (operating system) software
IOS software
Email clients